This article is about the demographics of the Socialist Federal Republic of Yugoslavia during its existence from 1945 until 1991. During its last census in 1991, Yugoslavia enumerated 23,528,230 people. Serbs had a plurality, followed by Croats, Bosniaks, Albanians, Slovenes and Macedonians.

Ethnic groups

This is data from the last four Yugoslav censuses (1961, 1971, 1981, and 1991). Ethnic groups that were considered to be constitutive (explicitly mentioned in the constitution, and not considered minority or immigrant) appear in bold text.

Republics by population

The population data are from the 1991 census.

Republics by population density

Vital statistics

Vital statistics 1947–1991

Marriages and divorces 1947–1991

History of national minorities in SFR Yugoslavia

1940s and 1950s 
The SFRY recognised "nations" (narodi) and "nationalities" (narodnosti) separately; the former included the constituent Slavic peoples, while the latter included other Slavic and non-Slavic ethnic groups such as Bulgarians and Slovaks (Slavic); and Hungarians and Albanians (non-Slavic). About a total of 26 known ethnic groups were known to live in Yugoslavia, including non-European originated Romani people.

Some of the largest non-Slavic ethnic minorities – Hungarians of Serbia, Germans (predominantly Danube Swabians), Kosovar Albanians and Istrian Italians – had been considered "troublesome" by Yugoslav authorities already in the first, interwar Yugoslavia, in part for supporting their ethnic interests and nation states as opposed to pan-Slavic ambitions during World War I. 

 Minority rights of non-Slavs were neither guaranteed nor upheld, but rather stifled if they had proved "anti-Yugoslavian". Education in Hungarian and German was limited, a number of Hungarian and German cultural societies had been banned in the Kingdom until the late 1930s, when the country drifted towards pro-axis positions. Nonetheless, local Germans collaborated with the Nazi occupation forces during World War II, and ethnic Hungarians generally welcomed the return of Bačka region to Hungary. The Yugoslav communist partisan movement was unpopular among those minorities, with the German Ernst Thälmann unit existing merely on paper and the Hungarian Petőfi unit numbering mere hundred men. After the occupation forces were pushed out of Yugoslavia, Germans, Hungarians and Italians who had collaborated with German and Italian military were either imprisoned in labor camps (such as Goli Otok prison) or executed in summary executions.

After World War II, around 250,000 Germans and Italians were expelled or fled from the country, fearing reprisals, their property confiscated, in the events known as the expulsion of Germans after World War II and Istrian–Dalmatian exodus, the latter in the newly annexed areas in Istria and Rijeka, as well as from Dalmatia. Hundreds (several thousands, according to some estimates) were summarily killed in the process. The same befell Hungarians, although to a much lesser extent, who faced summary executions in Vojvodina. After the war, however, free education in the native languages of the minorities were guaranteed by the Communist constitution.

During the era of Tito–Stalin split, many Hungarians (who in 1953 made up around 25% of the population in Vojvodina) were sympathetic towards the Hungarian People's Republic, and the words of Radio Budapest spread among the villagers.

In 1950s, various ethnic stereotypes about specific nations in the country were commonly recounted and circulated in the media. Czechs and Slovaks were "industrious and valuable minorities" for Yugoslavia. Some Czechs and Slovaks also emigrated after the war, but a "large number" of them returned  after communists seized power in Czechoslovakia in 1948.

See also
 Demographics of Bosnia and Herzegovina
 Demographics of Croatia
 Demographics of North Macedonia
 Demographics of Serbia and Montenegro
 Demographics of Montenegro
 Demographics of Serbia
 Demographics of Kosovo
 Demographics of Slovenia

Footnotes

References

Books

Journals

Socialist Federal Republic of Yugoslavia
Socialist Federal Republic